Cystic tumour of the atrioventricular nodal region is a very rare tumour of the heart in the region of the atrioventricular node.  It is also known as mesothelioma of the atrioventricular node.

Presentation
It may present as a cardiac arrhythmia or as sudden cardiac death.

Pathology
Cystic tumours of the atrioventricular nodal region, true to their name, have cystic spaces, which are lined by a single layer of histomorphologically benign epithelial cells.  The appearance is similar to that of lymphangioma and this is a name that has been used for this tumour.

Treatment
The treatment of cystic tumours of the atrioventricular nodal region is surgical excision.

See also
 Atrial myxoma
 Papillary fibroelastoma

References

Heart neoplasia